Einar Koefoed (born 22 March 1942) is a Norwegian former sailor. He competed in the Flying Dutchman event at the 1964 Summer Olympics.

References

External links
 

1942 births
Living people
Norwegian male sailors (sport)
Olympic sailors of Norway
Sailors at the 1964 Summer Olympics – Flying Dutchman
People from Asker
Sportspeople from Viken (county)